The sixth and final season of the American television drama series How to Get Away with Murder premiered on September 26, 2019, and concluded on May 14, 2020. Ordered in May 2019 by ABC, the season consisted of fifteen episodes, like its predecessors, due to a deal made with Viola Davis that the series would be limited to only 15 or 16 episodes per season.

Cast and characters

Main
 Viola Davis as Annalise Keating
 Billy Brown as Nate Lahey
 Jack Falahee as Connor Walsh
 Rome Flynn as Gabriel Maddox
 Aja Naomi King as Michaela Pratt
 Matt McGorry as Asher Millstone
 Conrad Ricamora as Oliver Hampton
 Amirah Vann as Tegan Price
 Charlie Weber as Frank Delfino
 Liza Weil as Bonnie Winterbottom

Recurring
 Marsha Stephanie Blake as Vivian Maddox 
 William R. Moses as Lanford, an FBI special agent 
 Jennifer Jalene as Avery Norris, an FBI agent 
 Tom Verica as Sam Keating 
 Ray Campbell as Solomon Vick 
 Kelen Coleman as Chloe Millstone 
 Gerardo Celasco as Xavier Castillo 
 Mercedes Mason as Cora Duncan 
 Cas Anvar as Robert Hsieh 
 Quei Tann as Peyton Osborn 
 Jennifer Parsons as Lydia Millstone 
 Deborah Levin as Sara Gordon / Denise Pullock 
 Lauren Bowles as Deanna Montes, an assistant United States attorney 
 Kathleen York as Martha Vitkay, a judge 
 Esai Morales as Jorge Castillo 
 Laura Innes as Lynne Birkhead, the governor of Pennsylvania 
 Cicely Tyson as Ophelia Harkness 
 Karla Souza as Laurel Castillo

Guest
 Emily Bergl as Sally 
 Kathleen Quinlan as Britt 
 Beverly Todd as Donna Fitzgerald 
 Sam Anderson as Thomas Fitzgerald 
 Jessica Marie Garcia as Rhonda Navarro 
 Natalia del Riego as Marisol Diaz 
 Oscar Daniel Reyez as Hector Diaz 
 Dijon Talton as Ravi 
 Tess Harper as Sheila Miller 
 Teya Patt as Paula Gladden 
 Alfred Enoch as Christopher Castillo 
 Cynthia Stevenson as Pam Walsh 
 D.W. Moffett as Jeff Walsh 
 Anne-Marie Johnson as Kendra Strauss 
 Dante Verica as young Gabriel Maddox
 Jamie McShane as Lennox, a United States attorney 
 Marc Grapey as Floyd Bishop
 Gwendolyn Mulamba as Celestine Harkness
 Famke Janssen as Eve Rothlo

Episodes

Production

Development
ABC renewed How to Get Away with Murder for a sixth season on May 10, 2019. After initial rumoring, it was announced on July 11, 2019, that the series would end with the upcoming season.

Writing 
Besides the plans of following up with the previous season's cliffhanger on the whereabouts of Laurel Castillo and her son, other storylines are intended to be depicted in the sixth season, including Tegan Price's past, Michaela's father and his relationship to Annalise, and Vivian Maddox's life and background. According to series creator Peter Nowalk, "Every crime [that's been committed] will come up for grabs, be answered for, and will have to be paid for" and "each character will have to decide what they're willing to do and to see if they're willing to sell other people out."

According to TVLine, a different mystery will be introduced by the end of the season premiere. "There will still be a flash forward in the first episode," Nowalk shared. "It's a mystery that's really big, the biggest one we've done. It makes us get on a high-speed train [headed] toward the end of the show." In the meantime, Annalise is "in bad shape" following Laurel's disappearance, and Nowalk says "we're going to see what Annalise's version of falling apart is". Plus, the FBI's ongoing investigation into Annalise and company "is front and center". Nowalk teases, "They know a lot, clearly. The question is, do they have the evidence to finally charge them? And who are they going to charge?" Additionally, one of Michaela's birth parents will come into the picture in a storyline that Nowalk describes as "very twisty, but also very emotional and surprising. I don't think the parent is going to be anyone you would expect."

Casting
For the sixth season, Timothy Hutton left the starring cast after his character's death. Karla Souza, who had portrayed Laurel Castillo since the series' inception, also exited the main cast, coinciding with Laurel and her son's disappearances in the previous season's finale.

In an interview with TV Insider, Nowalk revealed that Marsha Stephanie Blake would guest star in the season in a "great mystery role", later revealed to be that of Sam's ex-lover and Gabriel's mother, Vivian Maddox. In October 2019, Cas Anvar joined the supporting cast as Robert Hsieh, "an in-house lawyer of a popular dating app". In January 2020, it was announced that Lauren Bowles had been cast as Assistant U.S. Attorney Montes. In March 2020, Anne-Marie Johnson was cast as Kendra Strauss, a "chic, high-powered defense attorney", and Cicely Tyson's return was announced.

Reception

Critical response
Reviewing the first episode, Maureen Lee Lenker of Entertainment Weekly complimented Viola Davis's performance, writing, "We will never get tired of watching her deliver week after week. To be honest, it’s probably what we’ll miss most about the show." The A.V. Club Kayla Kumari Upadhyaya gave the first episode a "B+" rating, stating "It would make sense for [the series] to go fully off the rails one last time in its final season, especially as it attempts to weave together every story that's still open. But maybe this will finally be the season that the show doesn't lose itself in its own madness."

Ratings

References

External links
 
 

2019 American television seasons
2020 American television seasons
Season 6